1996 Kyoto Purple Sanga season

Review and events

League results summary

League results by round

Competitions

Domestic results

J.League

Emperor's Cup

J.League Cup

Player statistics

 † player(s) joined the team after the opening of this season.

Transfers

In:

Out:

Transfers during the season

In
 Shinsuke Shiotani (from Otsuka F.C.)
 Hironori Nagamine
 Ruy Ramos (from Verdy Kawasaki)
 Toshihiro Yamaguchi (from Gamba Osaka)
 Sérgio Soares da Silva (on May)
 Raudnei Aniversa Freire (on May)
 Shinji Fujiyoshi (from Verdy Kawasaki)
 Tomotetsu Kimura
 Shigetoshi Kitamura
 Masahiko Wada
 Shūji Nomiyama

Out
 Baltazar (on May)
 Flavio (on May)
 Hironori Nagamine
 Shuichi Uemura

Awards

none

References

Other pages
 J. League official site
 Kyoto Sanga F.C. official site

Kyoto Purple Sanga
Kyoto Sanga FC seasons